Wouter Berthout van Ranst was a 13th-century nobleman, living in feudal times, and a vassal of the Duke of Brabant. He was given land near the Escaut River, which he named Bergheem (now : Berchem in Flanders). His descendants possessed the land for centuries. The Belgian town of Ranst is also named after him.

References

 

Nobility of the Duchy of Brabant
People from Berchem